Edmund Jennings Randolph (August 10, 1753 September 12, 1813) was a Founding Father of the United States, attorney, and the 7th Governor of Virginia. As a delegate from Virginia, he attended the Constitutional Convention and helped to create the national constitution while serving on its Committee of Detail. He was appointed the first United States Attorney General by George Washington and subsequently served as the second Secretary of State during the Washington administration.

Early life
Randolph was born on August 10, 1753, to the influential Randolph family in Williamsburg in the Colony of Virginia. He was educated at the College of William and Mary. After graduation, he began reading law with his father John Randolph and uncle Peyton Randolph. In 1775, with the start of the American Revolution, Randolph's father remained a Loyalist and returned to Britain. Edmund Randolph returned to America where he joined the Continental Army as an aide-de-camp to General George Washington.

Upon the death of his uncle Peyton Randolph in October 1775, Randolph returned to Virginia to act as executor of the estate and, while there, was elected as a representative to the Fourth Virginia Convention. He was later mayor of Williamsburg and then attorney general of Virginia, a post he held until 1786. He was married on August 29, 1776, to Elizabeth Nicholas, the daughter of Robert C. Nicholas, and had a total of six children, including Peyton Randolph, Governor of Virginia from 1811 to 1812.

Political career

Early political career
Randolph was selected as one of 11 delegates to represent Virginia at the Continental Congress in 1779 and served as a delegate until 1782. He also remained in private law practice, handling numerous legal issues for Washington and others.

Randolph was elected as Governor of Virginia in 1786. That year, he was a delegate to the Annapolis Convention. He had taken on the young John Marshall as a student and then law partner and transferred his lucrative law practice to Marshall when Randolph became governor since Virginia law barred executive officers from private practice in its courts.

Constitutional Convention

The following year, as a delegate from Virginia to the Constitutional Convention, at 34, Randolph introduced the Virginia Plan as an outline for a new national government. He argued against the importation of  enslaved people and for a strong central government and advocated a plan for three chief executives from various parts of the country. The Virginia Plan also proposed a bicameral legislature, both houses of which would have delegates chosen based on state population. Randolph proposed and was supported unanimously by the convention's delegates "that a Nationally Judiciary be established" (Article III of the U.S. Constitution would establish the federal court system). The Articles of Confederation lacked a national court system for the United States.

Randolph was also a member of the "Committee of Detail," which was tasked with converting the Virginia Plan's 15 resolutions to a first draft of the Constitution.

Randolph ultimately refused to sign the final document, one of only three members who remained in the Constitutional Congress but refused to sign (the others were the fellow Virginian George Mason and Elbridge Gerry of Massachusetts). Randolph thought the final document lacked sufficient checks and balances and published an account of his objections in October 1787. He thought that the federal judiciary would threaten state courts, and he considered the Senate too powerful and Congress's power too broad. He also objected to the lack of a provision for a second convention to act after the present instrument had been referred to the states.

Role in ratification
Randolph served a significant role in the drafting of the original constitution. He helped to propose the Virginia Plan as a delegate from Virginia. This plan was eventually revised into the final draft of the U.S. Constitution. However, Randolph did not sign the Constitution's final draft because he wanted increased protections for individuals and did not agree with all of the revisions made to the original Virginia Plan.

Virginia Convention
Randolph nevertheless reversed his position at the Virginia Ratifying Convention in 1788. He chaired the nearly equally-divided convention, and Mason (as one of the leaders of the opposition, along with Patrick Henry) greatly resented Randolph's change of position. Mason and other opponents demanded amendments before ratification. Randolph noted that he had seen several responses to the insistence that modifications were necessary before ratification. Some thought the objection to be insubstantial because the Constitution provided a process for amendment. In common with other advocates of amending the Constitution before ratification, Randolph insisted that it would be easier to amend the Constitution before its ratification when a majority might do so than to ratify an imperfect Constitution and then to assemble the votes of three-fourths of the states. He did not think the people should become accustomed to altering their constitution with any regularity once it was adopted.

Governor Randolph had written, "If after our best efforts for amendments, they cannot be obtained, I will adopt the constitution as it is." Ultimately, Randolph said he voted for ratification of the Constitution because by June 2, eight other states had already done so, and he did not want to see Virginia left out of the new national government. Randolph believed Virginia must choose between the stark alternatives of ratification and disunion. Randolph never doubted the union's advantages.

In the Richmond Ratification Convention, Randolph ultimately pointed the way to an understanding of ratification with which Virginia's leaders could be satisfied. He assured his fellow members of the Virginia political elite that the Constitution that it was being asked to ratify in the summer of 1788 would have minimal significance and that it would enter more a league of sovereign states than a consolidated union.

Randolph wrote that his tactics swayed five of the ten delegates whose views had been entirely unknown to vote for ratification. Ultimately, Virginia's Federalists secured the Constitution's ratification by precisely five votes.

Washington's Cabinet
President Washington rewarded Randolph for his support. Randolph was appointed as the first U.S. Attorney General in September 1789. He maintained precarious neutrality in the feud between Thomas Jefferson (of whom Randolph was a second cousin) and Alexander Hamilton. In Washington's cabinet, as in the ratification dispute of 1787–1788, Randolph tried to bring people together rather than jump to hasty conclusions and ignore the potential costs in the pursuit of self-righteous ideological purity. He continued to make important contributions to the new nation's structure and its relationship with the states.

When Jefferson resigned as Secretary of State in 1793, Randolph succeeded him. The primary diplomatic initiative of his term was the Jay Treaty with Britain in 1794. Still, Hamilton devised the plan, wrote the instructions, and left Randolph the minor role of signing the papers. Hostile to the resulting treaty, Randolph almost gained Washington's ear but was overridden in the wake of the Fauchet scandal (see below). Near the end of his term as Secretary of State, negotiations for Pinckney's Treaty were finalized.

Romance and married life with Elizabeth Nicholas
Miss Nicholas was a daughter of the Hon. Robert Carter Nicholas, State Treasurer. Randolph wrote to his children after his wife's death: "We were both born in the city of Williamsburg, within twelve hours of each other; myself on the 10th of August 1753, and she on the 11th. My aunt Randolph, who saw each of us soon after our birth, facetiously foretold that we should be united in marriage-a circumstance which, improbable at the time from the dissensions of our families, seemed daily to grow into an impossibility from their increasing rancor. In childhood we were taught the elements of reading at the same school... she won me by the best of all graces, cheerfulness, good sense, and benevolence. I do not recollect that I reflected much upon that range of qualities, which I afterwards found to be constituents of nuptial happiness; but Providence seemed to be kinder to me than my most deliberate judgment could have been... I desired nothing more than that she should sincerely persuade herself that she would be happy with me."

On August 29, 1776, they were joined in wedlock. The relationship between Randolph and his wife had always been true and tender. So free from friction had been the course of their united lives that his daughters could not forget the single instance of misunderstanding. Mrs. Randolph, having related some incident, her husband hastily exclaimed: "That is mere gossip." The lady repaired to her room and did not answer her husband's gentle knock. Randolph said, "Betsey, I have urgent business in town, but I shall not leave this house until permitted to apologize to you." The door opened, and the unprecedented scene ended.

On March 6, 1810, a blow came from which Randolph could not recover; his wife died. After Mrs. Randolph's burial, the heartbroken husband wrote some account of her and their married life, which was addressed to his children as "the best witnesses of the truth of the brief history."

In part of this account, Randolph wrote, "My eyes are every moment beholding so many objects with which she was associated; I sometimes catch a sound which deludes me so much with the similitude of her voice; I carry about my heart and hold for a daily visit so many of her precious relics; and, above all, my present situation is so greatly contrasted by its vacancy, regrets, and anguish, with the purest and unchequered bliss, so far as it depended on her, for many years of varying fortune, that I have vowed at her grave daily to maintain with her a mental intercourse."

Resignation
A scandal involving an intercepted French message led to Randolph's resignation as Secretary of State in August 1795. Randolph had been tasked with maintaining friendly relations with France. The British Navy had intercepted correspondence from the French minister Joseph Fauchet to his superiors and turned it over to Washington, who was dismayed that the letters reflected contempt for the United States and that Randolph had been primarily responsible. The letters implied that Randolph had exposed the inner debates in the cabinet to France and had told it that the administration was hostile to the country. At the very least, Elkins and McKitrick conclude, there "was something here profoundly disreputable to the government's good faith and character."

Washington immediately overruled Randolph's negative advice about the Jay Treaty. A few days later, Washington handed the minister's letter to Randolph in the presence of the entire cabinet and demanded an explanation. Randolph was speechless and immediately resigned. Chernow and Elkins conclude that France did not bribe Randolph but that he "was rather a pitiable figure, possessed of some talents and surprisingly little malice, but subject to self-absorbed silliness and lapses of good sense."

However, Randolph's published Vindication illustrates his concerns about public and private perceptions of his character, which held great value in the 18th century. In the event, Randolph secured a published retraction from Fauchet.

After his resignation, Randolph was held personally responsible for losing a large sum of money during his administration of the state department. He was eventually adjudged to owe the government more than $49,000, which he paid.

Later life

After leaving the federal cabinet, Randolph returned to Virginia to practice law, where he was a leader of the state bar. His most famous case was defending Aaron Burr at his trial for treason in 1807.

In 1791, Randolph was elected to the American Philosophical Society.

Death and legacy
Randolph lived his final years as a guest of his friend Nathaniel Burwell at Carter Hall, near Millwood, Virginia, in Clarke County. He suffered from paralysis in his final years and died at 60 on September 12, 1813. He is buried nearby at the Burwell family cemetery adjacent to "Old Chapel."

Randolph County, West Virginia was formed in 1787 and named in Randolph's honor. Randolph County, Illinois was also named after him. Randolph, who was the governor of Virginia when the state ceded what was then sometimes called Illinois County, Virginia (a title disputed by Pennsylvania and others) to the new federal government, which created the Northwest Territory. Randolph County's motto is "where Illinois began" because it was one of the first two settled counties in the territory. It contains Kaskaskia, the first seat of Illinois County, which later became the Illinois Territory's capital and ultimately the state's first capital.

The Edmund J. Randolph Award is the highest award given by the US Department of Justice to persons who make "outstanding contributions to the accomplishments of the Department's mission."

References

 Conway, Moncure D. Omitted Chapters of History: Disclosed in the Life and Papers of Edmund Randolph. Vol. 2. New York: G.P. Putnam's Sons, 1888. 
 Gutzman, Kevin R.C. "Edmund Randolph and Virginia Constitutionalism." The Review of Politics 66.3 (2004)
 Maier, Pauline. Ratification: The People Debate the Constitution, 1787–1788. New York: Simon & Schuster, 2010.

Sources
 
  written by himself, with a preface by P.V. Daniel, Jr.

External links

 A Guide to the Executive Papers of Governor Edmund Randolph, 1786–1788 at The Library of Virginia

|-

|-

1753 births
1813 deaths
American Episcopalians
American people of English descent
Burials in Virginia
College of William & Mary alumni
Continental Army staff officers
Continental Congressmen from Virginia
18th-century American politicians
Delegates to the Virginia Ratifying Convention
Governors of Virginia
Mayors of Williamsburg, Virginia
Members of the Virginia House of Delegates
Edmund
American slave owners
United States Attorneys General
United States Secretaries of State
Virginia Attorneys General
Virginia Federalists
Virginia lawyers
Washington administration cabinet members
Nicholas family
American lawyers admitted to the practice of law by reading law
Aides-de-camp of George Washington
People from Millwood, Virginia
Drafting of the United States Constitution
Founding Fathers of the United States